Inonotus nothofagi is a species of fungus in the family Hymenochaetaceae. It is parasitic, and causes a white rot in the wood it infects. First described scientifically by mycologist George Herriot Cunningham, it is found in Australia and New Zealand where it infects Nothofagus cunninghamii, and India, where it grows on oak.

References

External links

Fungi described in 1948
Fungi of Asia
Fungi of Australia
Fungi of New Zealand
nothofagi
Taxa named by Gordon Herriot Cunningham